Rakim Cox (born February 12, 1991) is a Canadian football defensive end. He played college football at Villanova and signed with the Minnesota Vikings as an undrafted free agent in 2014.

Early years
Cox attended San Diego High School where he was Athlete of the Year and selected All-League first-team in 2008.

Professional career

Minnesota Vikings
On May 11, 2014, Cox signed with the Minnesota Vikings as undrafted free agent following the conclusion of the 2014 NFL Draft.

Miami Dolphins
On August 18, 2014, Cox signed with the Miami Dolphins.

Carolina Panthers
On May 11, 2015, Cox signed with the Carolina Panthers. On September 5, 2015, he was released by the Panthers. On September 7, 2015, Cox was signed to the Panthers' practice squad.

On February 7, 2016, Cox's Panthers played in Super Bowl 50. In the game, the Panthers fell to the Denver Broncos by a score of 24–10.

On August 30, 2016, Cox was placed on injured reserve. He was waived from injured reserve on September 6, 2016.

He participated in The Spring League in 2017.

Saskatchewan Roughriders
He was signed to the Saskatchewan Roughriders' practice squad on September 26, 2017.

Edmonton Eskimos
In 2018, Cox signed with the Edmonton Eskimos, playing in 3 games.

Toronto Argonauts
On August 31, 2018, Cox signed a practice roster agreement with the Toronto Argonauts.

Cologne Crocodiles
The Cologne Crocodiles of the German Football League announced on January 18, 2020, that they signed Cox for the 2020 season.

References

External links

Villanova bio
Miami Dolphins bio
Carolina Panthers bio

1991 births
Living people
Players of American football from San Diego
Players of Canadian football from San Diego
American football defensive ends
Canadian football defensive linemen
American players of Canadian football
Villanova Wildcats football players
Minnesota Vikings players
Miami Dolphins players
Carolina Panthers players
The Spring League players
Saskatchewan Roughriders players
Edmonton Elks players
Toronto Argonauts players
San Diego High School alumni